Rope access or industrial climbing or commercial climbing,  is a form of work positioning, initially developed from techniques used in climbing and caving, which applies practical ropework to allow workers to access difficult-to-reach locations without the use of scaffolding, cradles or an aerial work platform. Rope access technicians descend, ascend, and traverse ropes for access and work while suspended by their harnesses. Sometimes a work seat may be used. The support of the rope is intended to eliminate the likelihood of a fall altogether, but a backup fall arrest system is used in case of the unlikely failure of the primary means of support. This redundancy system is usually achieved by using two ropes - a working line and a safety line.

References

External links 

IRATA International - Industrial Rope Access Trade Association
IRATA International Code of Practice (ICOP)
SPRAT - The Society of Professional Rope Access Technicians
SPRAT Safe Practices for Rope Access Work
ISO 22846 - International Standard for Rope Access

Occupational safety and health
Working conditions
Climbing